Thyrsites atun (Euphrasén, 1791), the snoek, is a long, thin species of snake mackerel found in the seas of the Southern Hemisphere, and a popular food fish in South Africa, particularly along the west and southwest coast. This fish can reach a length of  SL though most do not exceed  SL. It is very important to commercial fisheries and is also a popular game fish. It is currently the only known member of its genus. It is also known in Australasia as barracouta though it is not closely related to the barracuda.

It is found near continental shelves or around islands and feeds on crustaceans, cephalopods and small fish like anchovy and pilchard. This species will form schools near the bottom or midwater; sometimes even near the surface at night.

It is found off the coast of Namibia and the coast of the Western Cape and Northern Cape provinces of South Africa, western and southern Australian waters especially Western Australia, Victoria and Tasmania, and New Zealand. It was originally called the "" (Sea Snoek) by Dutch colonists who arrived in the Cape in 1652. It is said to have reminded them of the freshwater pike (or ) they found at home in the Netherlands. The snoek is widely distributed in the colder waters in the Southern Hemisphere. It is found from Moçâmedes in Angola to Mossel Bay in South Africa, off Tristan da Cunha in the mid southern Atlantic and off Western Australia, where it is called the barracouta, off Chile and Argentina (where it is called the ). Bluish-black on top with a silver belly, the snoek grows to over a metre in length.  Contains an anticoagulant in its bite.

As food 
It is sold fresh, smoked, canned and frozen. It can be cooked by frying, broiling, baking and it can also be microwaved. It is also made and eaten as fishcakes in regions such as Japan. It is prepared most often by grilling, frying or smoking. Snoek is oily, extremely bony (although the bones are large and easily removed from the cooked fish) and has very fine scales which are almost undetectable, making it unnecessary to scale the fish while cleaning. Snoek has a very distinctive taste.

In South Africa, snoek is caught and consumed along the west and southwestern coastal parts of the country. Commercially, snoek is sold as a prepared and processed food throughout South Africa, usually in the form of packaged smoked snoek, snoek pates and as a canned food.

Snoek is usually bought fresh at the quay side. In and around Cape Town, this may be at Hout Bay, Kalk Bay and as far as Gordon's Bay. Up the West coast and down the coast towards Mossel Bay, much of the catch is often salted and air dried for local consumption.

Fresh snoek is typically barbecued over an open grill or wrapped up in aluminium foil with butter and herbs and served with boiled sweet potatoes and "tamatiesmoor" – a fried up hash of chopped tomatoes, onions, garlic and herbs. Another favourite is a kedgeree using smoked snoek.

In the Cape Malay community snoek is a foundation for many dishes. Dishes include smoorsnoek, snoekbredie (a stew), fish bobotie, and snoek pâtés.

In the subsistence fishing communities around the Cape's West coast, snoek together with other species of fish are cleaned, sliced and then packed flat and heavily salted with coarse salt. After a few days in this state, the fish are then hung up to air dry. The dried fish forms part of the community's staple diet as well as useful trading commodity. Much in the same way as the Portuguese use dried cod to make bacalhau, in these communities the dried fish is soaked in changes of fresh water until the fish is soft. This fish is then added to soups, stews and casseroles using indigenous and locally grown vegetables and often eaten with a variety of staples – potatoes, yams or rice.

Though very popular in regions like South Africa, it was not so popular to certain generations of British residents during the Second World War due to it being considered a food item of deprivation. Canned Snoek was imported in large quantities into Great Britain and government marketing of the product was not successful and may have had a negative effect.

References

External links
 
 Davidson, Alan. Oxford Companion to Food (1999). "Snoek". p. 731
 Snoek fishing in False Bay, South Africa circa 1976 – a black-and-white image gallery featuring commercial fishermen using hand lines to catch snoek.

Gempylidae
Monotypic fish genera
Fish described in 1791